Mohammad Obaid Ullah is a Bangladesh Nationalist Party politician and the former Member of Parliament of Gazipur-4.

Early life
Obaidullah was born into a Bengali Muslim family in Kapasia, Gazipur District.

Career
Ullah was elected to parliament from Gazipur-4 as a Bangladesh Nationalist Party candidate in 1988.

References

Bangladesh Nationalist Party politicians
Living people
4th Jatiya Sangsad members
Year of birth missing (living people)
People from Kapasia Upazila
20th-century Bengalis